77 West Wacker Drive, previously the United Building, is an American office building in the Loop, Chicago. The building, with 50 floors, was designed by Ricardo Bofill Taller de Arquitectura. It was formerly known as the RR Donnelley Building when RR Donnelley was the primary tenant. RR Donnelley moved its corporate headquarters to a different location in May 2005, and in 2007 the building became the corporate headquarters of United Airlines. The deal included naming rights to the building.

The building was the world headquarters of Chicago-based United Airlines and its parent company, United Continental Holdings. It also served as the headquarters for United Continental subsidiary Continental Airlines until its certificate was merged with United on November 30, 2011. In 2012, United moved its headquarters to the Willis Tower, where the company occupies around 20 floors.

Archer Daniels Midland moved its headquarters to the building in August 2014 from Decatur, Illinois. The building has a newsletter called "FOCUS", published by Prime Group Realty Trust.

History
By 1990, Keck, Mahin & Cate, a then-prominent Chicago-based law firm, considered moving out of its space in the Sears Tower and moving into a potential new development, which would become 77 West Wacker Drive. Brokers who were familiar with the lease negotiations stated that Sears was trying to keep Keck, Mahin & Cate in the building. Keck, Mahin & Cate decided to move into 77 West Wacker, and the Prime Group, developer of 77 West Wacker, finalized the development of the facility. In 1991, RR Donnelley leased  on floors 9 through 19 for its world headquarters, and Kemper Securities leased .

With the lease deals concluded, 77 West Wacker had 86% of its tenant space occupied. Jerry C. Davis of the Chicago Sun-Times said that the remaining space would be too small for some prospective tenants. Davis added that the leases to RR Donnelley and Kemper significantly altered "the complexion of the downtown office market." Keck Mahin & Cate moved from the Sears Tower to 77 W. Wacker in mid-1992; the firm suffered a series of practice group defections and questionable management decisions, and ultimately ceased operation in 1997.

In 2004, RR Donnelley signed a letter of intent to move out of 77 West Wacker. During the same year, McGuireWoods extended its lease by 8 years, changing the end date from December 31, 2010 to December 31, 2018. In addition, McGuireWoods expanded its leased space, effective February 1, 2004. The company gained an extra  of space in addition to its existing . As a result of the lease expansion of McGuireWoods, as of February 2004, 77 West Wacker was 92.2% leased.

In 2006, United Airlines agreed to move its 350 executives and some staff members from its Elk Grove Township campus to 77 West Wacker.

On August 13, 2012, United Continental Holdings announced its intention to once again relocate its world headquarters. An agreement was reached for United Continental Holdings to lease an additional  at Chicago's Willis Tower, joining the airline's operations center which leased an initial  in 2010. The company vacated the majority of their offices at 77 W. Wacker with the naming future of the building left unknown.

Design

77 W. Wacker is one of the most prominent examples of postmodern architecture in the city of Chicago.
The facade consists of glass surfaces framed in Portuguese white granite, with the dividers between the different floors linked by columns. The top floor is shaped like a Greek pediment. The ground floor houses a  atrium in gray and white marble. To enhance its panoramic view over the city, the building's skin is predominantly glazed. 

The interior is similarly styled. The classical Greek style is repeated inside, with Thassos marble walls and a 40 ft (12 m) tall coffered ceiling made of white oak wood.

A sculpture by Xavier Corberó called "Three Lawyers and A Judge" graces the building, as does Antoni Tàpies' artwork called "Big Eyelids". Bofill further contributed by creating a sculpture entitled "Twisted Columns" which appears to float above a reflecting pool. At night, 540 lamps light the building and its surroundings, along with a United sign that was added to the building in 2008.

Steve Baron, president of Prime Group Realty, said in 1990 that 77 West Wacker had "very compact floors with virtually no columns." Therefore, tenant companies would not pay for space that they would be unable to use.

Transportation
Chicago Transit Authority (CTA) bus lines serving the building include 22, 24, 29, 62, 124, 146 and 151. The closest Chicago 'L' stations are Clark/Lake, serving the Orange, Green, Blue, Purple, Pink and Brown Lines, and the State/Lake station, which serves the Orange, Green, Purple, Pink and Brown Lines, with a connection to the Red Line at Lake. The Metra Electric Line is the closest Metra line.

Position in skyline
In this lakefront view from 2006, 77 West Wacker is located between Buckingham Fountain and the Pittsfield Building.

In popular culture
The building is featured prominently in The Negotiator (1998) where it serves as the location of offices for the Internal Affairs Division of the Chicago Police Department.

The building was seen in the Bollywood movie Dhoom 3.

See also

 List of tallest buildings in Chicago
 List of works by Ricardo Bofill Taller de Arquitectura

References

External links

77 West Wacker Drive 
Emporis listing
Prime Group Realty Trust

Office buildings completed in 1992
Ricardo Bofill buildings
Skyscraper office buildings in Chicago
United Airlines
Continental Airlines
Airline company headquarters in the United States
Postmodern architecture in the United States
Modernist architecture in Illinois
Leadership in Energy and Environmental Design gold certified buildings
1992 establishments in Illinois